In mathematics, least squares function approximation applies the principle of least squares to function approximation, by means of a weighted sum of other functions. The best approximation can be defined as that which minimizes the difference between the original function and the approximation; for a least-squares approach the quality of the approximation is measured in terms of the squared differences between the two.

Functional analysis

A generalization to approximation of a data set is the approximation of a function by a sum of other functions, usually an orthogonal set: 

with the set of functions {} an orthonormal set over the interval of interest, : see also Fejér's theorem. The coefficients {} are selected to make the magnitude of the difference ||||2 as small as possible. For example, the magnitude, or norm, of a function  over the  can be defined by:

where the ‘*’ denotes complex conjugate in the case of complex functions. The extension of Pythagoras' theorem in this manner leads to function spaces and the notion of Lebesgue measure, an idea of “space” more general than the original basis of Euclidean geometry. The  satisfy   orthonormality relations:

where δij is the Kronecker delta. Substituting function  into these equations then leads to
the n-dimensional Pythagorean theorem:

The coefficients {aj} making ||f − fn||2 as small as possible are found to be:

The generalization of the n-dimensional Pythagorean theorem to infinite-dimensional  real inner product spaces is known as Parseval's identity or Parseval's equation. Particular examples of such a representation of a function are the Fourier series and the generalized Fourier series.

Further discussion

Using linear algebra

all within the subspace . Due to the frequent difficulty of evaluating integrands involving absolute value, one can instead define

As such,  or, equivalently, can thus be written in vector form:

Furthermore, this can be applied with a theorem:

References

Least squares
Approximation theory